Kwon So-Hyun (born January 29, 1987) is a South Korean actress.

Career
Kwon So-Hyun started her acting career as a musical stage actress in Beautiful Game (2007). In 2010, she won Best New Actress at the Daegu International Musical Festival. In 2015, she landed her first leading role in Shin Su-Won's third feature Madonna because she was the "fat" actress Shin had a hard time looking for. Her performance won her recognition, earning her numerous nominations, including winning Best New Actress at the 35th Korean Association of Film Critics Awards in 2015 and 3rd Wildflower Film Awards in 2016.

In 2022, Kwon signed a contract with J Flex.

Filmography

Film

Television series

Web series

Theatre

Awards and nominations

References

External links 
 Kwon So-hyun at Blossom Entertainment 
 
 
 

1987 births
Living people
People from Andong
21st-century South Korean actresses
South Korean film actresses
Sangmyung University alumni
South Korean stage actresses
South Korean musical theatre actresses
Best Supporting Actress Paeksang Arts Award (film) winners